Arnold Walker may refer to:

Arnold Walker (footballer) (1932–2017), English footballer
Arnold Walker (RAF officer) (1917–2008), British pilot
Arnold Walker (rugby league) (born 1952), English rugby league footballer
Arnold Charles Walker (or Kumanjayi Walker) (2000-19), shot while resisting arrest